Hayward Regional Shoreline is a regional park located on the shores of the San Francisco Bay in Hayward, California. It is part of the East Bay Regional Parks system. The 1,713 acre park extends to the shores of San Lorenzo. Part of the park is former commercial salt flats purchased in 1996. A former landfill, now capped with soil and plants, is located in the park. The park includes the 250 acre tidal wetland, Cogswell Marsh, and the 364 acre Oro Loma Marsh (constructed in 1997). Located to the south of the park is the Hayward Shoreline Interpretive Center, which provides information on the Bay shore habitats. The San Francisco Bay Trail runs through the park, which connects the park with San Lorenzo Creek.

References

External links
 Hayward Regional Shoreline official web page
 Hayward Regional Shoreline at the San Francisco Bay Trail Project website

East Bay Regional Park District
Parks in Hayward, California
San Francisco Bay Trail
Former landfills in California